Barrett Lake is a lake in the Selkirk Mountains in the West Kootenay region of the Regional District of Central Kootenay in British Columbia, Canada. The lake is the source of Barrett Creek, a tributary of the Salmo River. The lake is surrounded by a series of mountain peaks including Dominion Mountain, Empire Peak, Commonwealth Mountain and others. There is an emergency cabin maintained by Recreation Sites and Trails BC.

References

Lakes of British Columbia
Kootenay Land District